The Arch Street Theatre in Philadelphia, Pennsylvania, during the 19th century, was one of the three main Philadelphia theaters for plays; the other two were the Walnut Street Theatre and the Chestnut Street Theatre. The Arch Street Theatre opened on 1 October 1828 under the management of William B. Wood. The building's architect was John Haviland.

History
The building which housed the Arch Street Theatre was located between 6th and 7th Streets at 819 Arch Street. Famous performers, such as Fanny Davenport, Joseph Jefferson, and Charlotte Cushman, played at what was popularly called "The Arch". John Wilkes Booth joined the theatre's stock company in 1857 and played for a full season. He appeared occasionally at the Arch during the 1850s and early 1860s.

In the 1830s Edwin Forrest played many successful roles at the Arch, and several original plays written at his request debuted there.

In 1832 the Arch Street Theatre had an entire company of American actors, which was a first for American theater companies. The managers were William Forrest, William Duffy, and William Jones. The company included James E. Murdoch.

In 1860 the stockholders of the Arch suggested that Louisa Lane Drew should assume the management, and in 1861 the theatre was opened under the name "Mrs. John Drew's Arch Street Theatre".  Louisa Lane Drew was the grandmother of Lionel, Ethel and John Barrymore.

 In 1875 the theatre became the venue for the first performance of a work by Gilbert and Sullivan in America when Alice Oates staged an unauthorised and approximate performance of Trial by Jury here.

During the third season under Louisa Lane Drew's management, Lester Wallack, E. L. Davenport, and Edwin Booth acted at the Arch.

In the summer of 1863 the theatre was pulled down and rebuilt (with red plush seats and crystal chandeliers) from the stage to the façade; the seating capacity was one thousand, nine-hundred eleven.

In 1898 Morris Finkel rented the Arch Street Theatre and presented Yiddish theater for several months, including one week of performances by Keni Liptzin. The prolific Yiddish theatre composer Joseph Brody, recently arrived from Russia, got his American start there as well. However, Finkel soon abandoned the project and the Arch returned to vaudeville. In 1909 Mike (Mordechai) Thomashefsky took over the Arch and presented both vaudeville and Yiddish theatre until his death in 1932.

The Arch Street Theater was rented in 1921 as a hall for Jewish High Holiday services.

The Arch Street Theatre was demolished in 1936.

References

External links
 Charles N. Mann Manuscript for History of the Arch Street Theatre at the Harry Ransom Center

History of theatre
Theatres in Philadelphia
19th-century theatre
Commercial buildings completed in 1828
History of Philadelphia
1828 establishments in Pennsylvania